Robert Wayne Danielson Jr. (August 25, 1946 – September 7, 1995) was an American serial killer who murdered at least six people during an eleven month killing spree in three states between 1981 and 1982, following his parole for murdering an acquaintance in 1970. Convicted and sentenced to death by the state of California, where two of his murders occurred, Danielson killed himself while awaiting execution at San Quentin State Prison in September 1995.

Early life 
Danielson was born on August 25, 1946, in Iowa. Although little was initially reported about his childhood, it was later revealed that Danielson had experienced depression and drug use. He also later underwent a religious conversion in prison.

Murders 
On June 23, 1970, Danielson got into an argument with 21-year-old Thomas Elroy Davis after a roadside encounter near Marcola, Oregon. After some time, Danielson brandished a gun and fatally shot Davis. He was charged with first-degree murder not long after, but after an initial mistrial, which resulted from the prosecution presenting improper evidence, that charge was dismissed. Instead, in November 1970, Danielson pleaded guilty to voluntary manslaughter and several other charges, although persisted that he shot Davis only because Davis pulled a gun on him first. Danielson received a sentence of 25 years in prison.

In 1981, after serving eleven years of his sentence at Oregon State Penitentiary, Danielson was granted parole, and was released from prison.
On December 9, 1981, weeks after his release, Danielson confronted 60-year-old Harold and 55-year-old Betty Pratt at a desert campsite in Arizona. He bound their hands with a rope, and shot both in the head, execution style, and later stole their pickup truck. The next day, their bodies were discovered, and their truck was found abandoned in Yuma. In the subsequent investigation, investigators put out a reward of $5,000 for information.

In the following months, Danielson, who was residing in Springfield, Oregon, became acquainted with 14-year-old Lenora Hart Johnson and the two sparked a relationship, with Johnson herself later stating it was "like a common-law marriage". On June 25, 1982, Danielson and Johnson bound 62-year-old Arthur Gray at a park in Eugene, Oregon, and Danielson shot him in the back of the head.

In July, Danielson, accompanied by Johnson, stumbled into 69-year-old Benjamin and 62-year-old Edith Shaffer at a park in Manchester, California. Johnson bound the Shaffer's hands with twine, and Danielson proceeded to demand she walk their dog away from the scene. When she was a far enough distance away, Danielson shot the couple to death. In November, Danielson murdered 38-year-old Ernest Corral in a similar fashion in Apache Junction, Arizona.

Arrest 
In December 1983, the bodies of the Shaffers were unearthed inside a ravine off Mountain View Road. During the investigation, detectives located Johnson, who confessed to being involved in the murders, but said the murderer was Robert Wayne Danielson, a 37-year-old who was on parole for a 1970 murder at the time of the Shaffer's disappearance. She also told investigators about the murder of Arthur Gray, and the other murders which Danielson confessed to her.

Following this, Danielson was charged with two counts of murder, but did not surrender to the police and was considered a fugitive. On April 6, 1984, Danielson was located in Odessa, Texas, and he was arrested at his job at a traveling carnival.

Trials 
Danielson was to stand trial for the California murders first. During one day of his trial, Danielson's mother Mary Ann Bishop attempted to pass her son a loaded revolver as he entered the Mendocino Courthouse. The attempt was noticed, Bishop was arrested, and was given a 3-year prison term.

In July 1986, the jury composed of four women and eight men found Danielson guilty of killing the Shaffers, and on the basis of which made him eligible for the death penalty. Danielson pleaded for his life to be spared, even exclaiming during his testimony "I'm disgusted with myself". During the sentencing phase, his lawyers said that other infamous criminals such as Charles Manson, Juan Corona, and the Hillside Stranglers were sentenced to life rather than to death (Manson was sentenced to death, but had his sentence commuted to life after capital punishment was temporarily ruled unconstitutional, while Corona committed his crimes before capital punishment was reinstated). Two months after his conviction, the jury ultimately sentenced Danielson to death.

After the trial, Danielson was extradited to Oregon to stand trial for the murder of Arthur Gray.
In February 1987, Danielson was found guilty, but was not eligible for execution due to Oregon's capital punishment statute not being in effect when Gray was murdered, so instead the jury imposed the sentence of life imprisonment on February 22.

Death 
For the remainder of his death sentence, Danielson was housed in San Quentin State Prison awaiting execution. On September 7, 1995, a San Quentin corrections officer named J.S. Spellman found Danielson hanging from a white tube sock in his cell. After unsuccessfully attempting to gain Danielson's attention, he signaled to other prison officials, who declared Danielson dead.

See also 
 List of serial killers in the United States

External links 
 Condemned Inmates Who Have Died Since 1978

References 

1946 births
1995 deaths
1995 suicides
20th-century American criminals
American male criminals
American people convicted of murder
American people who died in prison custody
American prisoners sentenced to life imprisonment
American serial killers
Male serial killers
People convicted of murder by California
People convicted of murder by Oregon
Prisoners sentenced to death by California
Prisoners sentenced to life imprisonment by Oregon
Prisoners who died in California detention
San Quentin State Prison inmates
Serial killers who committed suicide in prison custody
Suicides by hanging in California